Lithocarpus daphnoideus is a tree in the beech family Fagaceae. The specific epithet  is from the Greek meaning "like Daphne", referring to the genus Daphne and its leaves.

Description
The greyish brown bark is smooth or fissured.

Distribution and habitat
Lithocarpus daphnoideus grows naturally in Sumatra, Peninsular Malaysia, Java and Borneo. Its habitat is hill dipterocarp to lower montane forests up to  altitude.

References

daphnoideus
Trees of Sumatra
Trees of Peninsular Malaysia
Trees of Java
Trees of Borneo
Plants described in 1829